Geriş may refer to the following villages in Turkey:

Geriş, Akseki
Geriş-bucak merkezi, Akseki
Geriş, Bartın 
Geriş, Çaycuma 
Geriş, Kıbrıscık 
Geriş, Yığılca